Grund is a German and Scandinavian surname. Notable people with the surname include:

Annelie Grund (born 1953), German artist
Arlindo Grund (born 1974), Brazilian television presenter
Cynthia M. Grund (born 1956), American philosopher and educator
Francis Grund (1805–1863), German-born American journalist and author
Friedrich Wilhelm Grund (1791–1874), German composer, conductor and teacher
Jan Grund (born 1946), Norwegian academic
Johann Gottfried Grund (1733–1796), German-Danish sculptor
Johanna Grund (1934–2017), German journalist, writer and politician
Kevin Grund (born 1987), German footballer
Manfred Grund (born 1955), German politician
Norbert Grund (1717–1767), Czech painter

See also
Friedl Behn-Grund (1906–1989), German cinematographer
Madeleine Grundström (born 1980), Swedish handball goalkeeper

References

German-language surnames
German toponymic surnames